

Wilhelm Berthold Helmuth Beukemann (9 May 1894 – 13 July 1981) was a general in the Wehrmacht of Nazi Germany during World War II. He was a recipient of the Knight's Cross of the Iron Cross.

Awards and decorations
 Iron Cross (1914) 2nd Class (9 September 1914) and 1st Class (23 May 1916)
 Brunswick War Merit Cross 2nd Class (24 June 1915) and 1st Class (21 May 1918)
 Bewährungsabzeichen (probation badge) to the War Merit Cross 2nd Class (18 June 1918)
 Wound Badge in Black (17 August 1918)
 Hanseatic Cross of Hamburg (16 May 1916)
 Knight's Cross of the Royal House Order of Hohenzollern with Swords (24 October 1918)
 Clasp to the Iron Cross (1939) 2nd Class (21 September 1939) and 1st Class (15 October 1939)
 Anerkennungsurkunde des Oberbefehlshabers des Heeres (1 May 1941)
 Knight's Cross of the Iron Cross on 14 May 1941 as Oberst and commander of Infanterie-Regiment 382
 German Cross in Gold on 20 January 1944 as Generalleutnant and commander of the 75. Infanterie-Division

References

Citations

Bibliography

 
 
 
 

1894 births
1981 deaths
Lieutenant generals of the German Army (Wehrmacht)
Military personnel from Hamburg
German Army personnel of World War I
Recipients of the Gold German Cross
Recipients of the Knight's Cross of the Iron Cross
Recipients of the Silver Medal of Military Valor
German prisoners of war in World War II held by the United States
Recipients of the clasp to the Iron Cross, 1st class